The Salim Habib University (SHU) formerly known as  Barrett Hodgson University is a private university located in Karachi, Sindh, Pakistan. It was established in 2016. It offers multiple courses in Engineering, Management Sciences and Life Sciences.

References

External links 
 SHU official website

Universities and colleges in Karachi
Educational institutions established in 2016
2016 establishments in Pakistan
Engineering universities and colleges in Pakistan